Juberri or Juverri is a village in Andorra, located in the south of the country near the Spanish border, above the main CG-1 road between Andorra la Vella and la Seu d'Urgell in Catalonia, Spain. It is part of the parish of Sant Julià de Lòria.

References

Michelin road atlas of France, 3rd Ed., 1990 map, p. 260.

Populated places in Andorra
Sant Julià de Lòria
Andorra–Spain border crossings